The 2016 Cary Challenger was a professional tennis tournament played on hard courts. It was the 2nd edition of the tournament which was part of the 2016 ATP Challenger Tour. It took place in Cary, North Carolina, United States between 10 and 18 September 2016.

Singles main-draw entrants

Seeds

 1 Rankings are as of August 29, 2016.

Other entrants
The following players received wildcards into the singles main draw:
  Nick Stachowiak
  Brayden Schnur
  Nicholas Horton
  Ryan Shane

The following players received entry from the qualifying draw:
  James McGee
  Mackenzie McDonald
  Ryan Haviland
  Erik Crepaldi

Champions

Singles

 James McGee def.   Ernesto Escobedo, 1–6, 6–1, 6–4.

Doubles

 Philip Bester /  Peter Polansky def.  Austin Krajicek /  Stefan Kozlov, 6–2, 6–2.

External links
Official Website

Cary Challenger
Cary Challenger